Bashkyroleter is an extinct genus of nycteroleterid parareptile which existed in European Russia during the middle Permian period.

References

Pareiasauromorphs
Permian reptiles of Europe
Extinct animals of Russia
Prehistoric reptile genera